Pelvic floor physical therapy (PFPT) is a specialty area within physical therapy focusing on the rehabilitation of muscles in the pelvic floor after injury or dysfunction. It can be used to address issues such as muscle weakness or tightness post childbirth, dyspareunia, vaginismus, vulvodynia, constipation, fecal or urinary incontinence, pelvic organ prolapse, and sexual dysfunction. Licensed physical therapists with specialized pelvic floor physical therapy training address dysfunction in individuals across the gender and sex spectra, though PFPT often associated with women's health for its heavy focus on addressing issues of pelvic trauma after childbirth.

Evaluating pelvic floor function 
Pelvic floor physical therapists perform an initial examination to determine the likely underlying muscular or nerve dysfunction causing a patient's symptoms. Therapists will manually examine muscles of the pelvic floor both externally and internally, palpating to locate trigger points of pain and guiding patients to manually tighten or loosen muscles to assess tone and function. During this initial exam, PFPT must isolate the cause of dysfunction to one of two broader categories: low-tone or high-tone disorders. Low-tone disorders, such as stress-urinary incontinence, overactive bladder, pelvic organ prolapse, and anal incontinence, are caused by weakened muscles in the pelvic floor. High-tone disorders, such as pelvic floor myofascial pain, dyspareunia, vaginismus, and vulvodynia, are caused by overly strong or active muscles in the pelvic floor. While low-tone disorders can be addressed through exercises such as Kegels meant to strengthen the pelvic floor, high-tone disorders can be worsened by such exercises and must be addressed through other means such as biofeedback or dilation training.

Pelvic floor disorders treated with PFPT

Chronic pelvic pain (CPP) 
Chronic pelvic pain is an umbrella category of dysfunctions of the pelvic region associated with long-term discomfort, and includes diagnoses such as dyspareunia, vaginismus, vulvodynia or vestibulodynia, endometriosis, interstitial cystitis, chronic nonbacterial prostatitis, chronic proctalgia, piriformis syndrome, hip dysfunction, and pudendal neuralgia. Around 1 in 4 women and between 2% to 10% of men experience chronic pelvic pain, making CPP of high clinical relevance. Just as chronic pain is conceptualized elsewhere in the body, CPP is considered to have many underlying and interconnected causes, and therefore treatment is often interdisciplinary. PFPT is considered to be a key element in the treatment of CPP, working to reduce pain or enhance function by normalizing pelvic floor muscle tone and endurance.

Sexual dysfunction 
Many disorders which cause chronic pelvic pain (CPP), such as dyspareunia and vaginismus, are associated with discomfort during intercourse. As a result, the treatment of CPP with pelvic floor physical therapy is often related to the treatment of sexual dysfunction. Pelvic floor physical therapy has also been shown to be effective in the treatment of erectile dysfunction (ED), providing a treatment avenue with less risk of complication than commonly prescribed medications or surgical interventions. Multiple randomized controlled trials have seen a range from modest to significant success with pelvic floor physical therapy treatments for ED. Research has also shown success in treating premature ejaculation with pelvic floor physical therapy, although the underlying reasons for this success are unknown. It is possible that PFPT is helpful in addressing disorders such as ED and premature ejaculation simply because it enhances awareness and control over individual muscles or muscle groups in the pelvic region.

Urinary/fecal problems 
Large, systematic reviews have shown that stress urinary incontinence (SUI) can be treated with high success using PFPT. The treatment of overactive bladder syndrome, a more complex disorder characterized by a larger range of symptoms, as well as fecal incontinence with PFPT has shown more modest success. A pelvic floor physiotherapist will advise on simple exercises focused on the pelvic floor muscles and core muscles which help to strengthen those muscles and for improving bladder control. For patients who have urinary incontinence along with some other health condition, such as interstitial cystitis or scarring of pelvic muscles after delivery, a physiotherapist will introduce a customized treatment plan to solve bladder problems, as well as offer relief from the pain and discomfort associated with the disease. There are also many benefits associated with pelvic floor physical therapy specifically in postpartum women including increasing muscle strength and endurance on top of decreasing the rate of urinary incontinence. More research is needed to determine the best treatments within PFPT and/or interdisciplinary approaches to treatments for these disorders. Higher than average pelvic floor physical tone is thought to be a component of constipation, anismus, and irritable bowel syndrome (IBS). In addition, research shows that it is more beneficial for women to train for longer periods of time (>12 weeks or ≥ 24 sessions) with shorter sessions (10–45 minutes). Those who accumulate a greater number of shorter sessions achieve a greater decrease in urine loss than those who participate in smaller number of longer sessions. Because these disorders can be of unknown origin or may be caused by multiple lifestyles, genetic, and physical factors, PFPT may only be effective for some individuals with these conditions or may be most effective as part of a larger treatment plan.

References 

Physical therapy
Pelvis